Fairmount, Nova Scotia is a neighbourhood of Halifax, Nova Scotia, Canada.

History
From 1847 until 1868, Fairmount was home to a zoo.

In 1896, the Archdiocese of Halifax-Yarmouth used the land for Mount Olivet Cemetery (Halifax), a Roman Catholic cemetery. The cemetery contains the graves of some victims of the Titanic disaster, and some of the victims of the Halifax Explosion.

Geography
The neighbourhood of Fairmount is encompassed to its north, south, and west by Armdale, and the West End to its east. Fairmount has a landmass of 85 hectares (0.85 km2).

Demographics
Although an established neighbourhood of Halifax, Fairmount does not have demographic estimates.

Transportation
Fairmount has one transit route that travels through its boundaries; Route 26 (Springvale). Although there is only one transit route that serves the neighbourhood, Route 26 (Springvale) connects to the Mumford Terminal--which the transit-user can use to get other communities and terminals throughout the urban area of Halifax.

References

 HRM Neighbourhood Map

Communities in Halifax, Nova Scotia